Stefani Stoeva (born 23 September 1995) is a Bulgarian badminton player specializing in doubles. Her current partner is her older sister, Gabriela Stoeva. They competed at the 2016 and 2020 Summer Olympics. The duo together have won gold medals in the 2015 European Games and three successive European Championships in 2018, 2021 and 2022 editions. Stefani Stoeva has also won some individual titles in women's singles competition.

Career 

Stoeva started playing badminton at age 9 at the Haskovo School Club in 2007. She won gold medals at the U17 European Championships in the girls' singles and doubles. At the 2014 Scottish Open Grand Prix, she won in the women's doubles event, partnered with Gabriela Stoeva. They beat Heather Olver and Lauren Smith of England in the finals round with the score 21-7, 21-15.

In 2015, she won the Dutch Open in women's doubles against the top seeds, World No.7 Eefje Muskens and Selena Piek of Nederlands with the score 24–22, 21–15 in the final. She won the Russian Open against Johanna Goliszewski and Carla Nelte of German 21–15, 21–17. She competed in the European Games, and won gold in the women's doubles alongside her sister.

In 2016, Stoeva competed at the Rio 2016 Summer Olympics, but did not advance to the knocked-out stage after placing third in the group D stage.

In 2017, she became the women's doubles runner-up at the Swiss Open Grand Prix Gold. They lost to China pair Chen Qingchen and Jia Yifan with the score 16–21, 15–21. The sisters also won the silver medal at the European Championships.

In 2021, she won her second European Championships title.

Achievements

European Games 
Women's doubles

European Championships 
Women's doubles

European Junior Championships 
Girls' singles

Girls' doubles

BWF World Tour (8 titles, 6 runners-up) 
The BWF World Tour, which was announced on 19 March 2017 and implemented in 2018, is a series of elite badminton tournaments sanctioned by the Badminton World Federation (BWF). The BWF World Tour is divided into levels of World Tour Finals, Super 1000, Super 750, Super 500, Super 300 (part of the HSBC World Tour), and the BWF Tour Super 100.

Women's doubles

BWF Grand Prix (3 titles, 3 runners-up) 
The BWF Grand Prix had two levels, the Grand Prix and Grand Prix Gold. It was a series of badminton tournaments sanctioned by the Badminton World Federation (BWF) and played between 2007 and 2017.

Women's doubles

  BWF Grand Prix Gold tournament
  BWF Grand Prix tournament

BWF International Challenge/Series (28 titles, 9 runners-up) 
Women's singles

Women's doubles

  BWF International Challenge tournament
  BWF International Series tournament
  BWF Future Series tournament

References

External links 
 
 

1995 births
Living people
People from Gabrovo
Bulgarian female badminton players
Badminton players at the 2016 Summer Olympics
Badminton players at the 2020 Summer Olympics
Olympic badminton players of Bulgaria
Badminton players at the 2015 European Games
European Games gold medalists for Bulgaria
European Games medalists in badminton